This is a list of towns and villages in the county of Isle of Wight, England.

Towns
There are nine main towns, most located along the north and east coasts. By greater area population, Ryde is the largest with a population of 32,072. Newport is the centrally located county town, with an area population of 25,496. Most settlements link to Newport by road, which is a hub for island services. There are no settlements with city status; the nearest city is Portsmouth, five miles north-east, then Southampton, ten miles north of Cowes.

Villages
Places that describe themselves as villages are as follows:

Hamlets and other places

See also
List of United Kingdom locations
List of Sites of Special Scientific Interest on the Isle of Wight
List of places in England

References

External links

Map of places on the Isle of Wight compiled from this list
Isle of Wight Towns & Villages, Isle of Wight Time, Greenwich Mean Time website
Place Name Index, Wightcam- Photographically Illustrated Walks on the Isle of Wight
The Villages and Towns of the Isle of Wight, Southern Life (UK) website; History of the Villages of Hampshire, Dorset and Isle of Wight Counties.

List of places
Isle of Wight
Places